Agathuru  is a village in the southern state of Karnataka, India. It is located in the Heggadadevankote taluk of Mysore district.

See also
 Mysore
 Districts of Karnataka

References

External links

Villages in Mysore district